Tafsir refers to exegesis, usually of the Quran. A Quranic tafsir attempts to provide elucidation, explanation, interpretation, context or commentary for clear understanding and conviction of God's will.

Principally, a tafsir deals with the issues of linguistics, jurisprudence, and theology. In terms of perspective and approach, tafsir can be broadly divided into two main categories, namely tafsir bi-al-ma'thur (lit. received tafsir), which is transmitted from the early days of Islam through the Islamic prophet Muhammad and his companions, and tafsir bi-al-ra'y (lit. tafsir by opinion), which is arrived through personal reflection or independent rational thinking.

There are different characteristics and traditions for each of the tafsirs representing respective schools and doctrines, such as Sunni Islam, Shia Islam, and Sufism. There are also general distinctions between classic tafsirs compiled by authoritative figures of Muslim scholarship during the formative ages of Islam, and modern tafsir which seeks to address a wider audience, including the common people.

Etymology 
The word  is derived from the three-letter Arabic verbal root of  F-S-R ('interpreted'). In its literal meaning, the word refers to interpreting, explaining, expounding, or disclosing. In Islamic contexts, it is defined as understanding and uncovering God's will which has been conveyed by the Quranic text, by means of the Arabic language and one's own knowledge.

History 

The first examples of tafsir can be traced back to Muhammad. According to Islamic belief, as the Quran was revealed to him, he recited the verses to his companions, usually explaining their meanings to teach them, as it was one of Muhammad's responsibilities. Elements of Muhammad's explanations including clarifying verses whose intents are not understood, the indication of names, places, times etc. which have not been mentioned in the verse, restriction of meanings which have been given as absolute and reconciliation of expressions which seem contradictory. Although scholars including ibn Taymiyyah claim that Muhammad has commented on the whole of the Quran, others including Ghazali cite the limited amount of narratives (hadith), thus indicating that he has commented only on a portion of the Quran.

After the death of Muhammad, his companions (sahabah) undertook the task of interpretation, thus starting a new age in tafsir. Most of the sahabah, including Abu Bakr, refrained from commenting based on their personal views, and only narrated comments by Muhammad. Others including ibn Abbas used their own knowledge from the Arabic language to interpret the Quran. At this stage, tafsir was selective and concise regarding its coverage, and only certain words, phrases and verses were explained. The Quran was still not fully interpreted, and commentaries were not separated from the hadith collection nor written separately, mainly due to other occupations such as the collection of the Quran.

By the time of the next generations ensuing the sahabah, scholars in the age of the successors (tabi'in) started using a wide range of sources for tafsir. The whole of the Quran is interpreted, and narrations are separated from tafsir into separate books and literature. Grammatical explanations and historical data are preserved within these books; personal opinions are recorded, whether accepted or rejected. During this time, a whole range of schools of tafsir came into existence in different scholastic centers, including Mecca, Medina and Iraq. Iraqi schools of tafsir came to be known for an approach relied on personal judgment aside from the transmitted reports, and Jewish apocryphal reports were also widely employed. Notable compilers on this age including Sufyan al-Thawri.

Until this age, tafsir had been transmitted orally and had not been collected independently in a book, rather, they had been gathered by muhaddithun (lit. scholars of hadith) in their hadith books, under the topic of tafsir, along with other narrations of Muhammad. This indicates that tafsir, in its formative age, used to be a special domain within hadith. Widening of the scope of tafsir and emergence of mufassirun in the age of the successors lead to the development of an independent discipline of tafsir.

Conditions 

According to Sunni Islamic scholar Al-Suyuti, mufassirs are required to master 15 fields from different disciplines such as linguistics, rhetoric, theology and jurisprudence before one can authoritatively interpret the Quran. The foremost discipline that constitutes the basis of tafsir learning is Arabic language. Arabic in this context specifically means Classical Arabic. One of the earliest Islamic scholars Mujahid ibn Jabr said, "It is not permissible for one who holds faith in Allah and the Day of Judgment to speak on the Qur'an without learning classical Arabic." Especially relevant expertise is how one learns the meaning of each word. In this respect, it should be known that classical Arabic must be mastered in its entirety because one word may have various meanings; a person may only know two or three of them whereas the meaning of that word in the Qur'an may be altogether different. Other fields related to Arabic language includes Philology of Arabic. It is important because any change in the diacritical marks affects the meaning, and understanding the diacritical marks depends on the science of Arabic philology. Morphology of Arabic language is also important because changes in the configuration of verb and noun forms change the meaning. Ibn Faris said, "A person who misses out on Arabic morphology has missed out on a lot." Lastly, Al-Ishtiqaaq is the science of etymology which explains the reciprocal relation and radical composition between the root and derived word. It should be learned because sometimes one word derives from two root words, the meaning of each root word being different. For example, a word masih derives from the root word massah (مَسَّة) which means "to feel something and to touch something with a wet hand," but also derives from the root word masaahat which means "to measure."

Another relevant discipline is the science of interpreting the Arabic sentence. Ilm al-Ma'ani is the science by which one figures the syntax through the meaning of a sentence. Ilm al-Bayaan is the science by which one learns the similes, metaphors, metonymies, zuhoor (evident meanings) and khafa (hidden meanings) of the Arabic language. Ilm al-Badi is the science by which one learns to interpret sentences in which the beauty and eloquence of the spoken and written word are considered hidden. The above-mentioned three sciences are categorized as Ilm-ul-Balagha (science of rhetoric). It is one of the most principal sciences to a mufassir as it is deemed by Muslims that there are literal and non-literal meanings of the Quran, and one is able to reveal the miraculous nature of the Quran through these three sciences. A field from Quranic teaching is called Ilm al-Qira'at. This is a system of dialecticism of the different readings of the Quran. This science is important because one qira'at (way of reading) of the Quran may differ in meaning from another, and one learns to favor one reading over another based on the difference in the meanings.

General sciences of Islamic theology and Islamic study are also imperative. Ilm al-Aqa'id and Ilm al-Kalam are comprehensive sciences in Islamic theology and philosophy. They are important because upon these understandings, one may understand issues such as invalidity of attributing the literal meaning of some ayah to God. In this case, one will be required to interpret the ayah as in 'the hand of Allah is over their hand'. Other key issues required to be addressed through comprehension of theology and philosophy includes that of free will and determinism, or the infallibility of the prophets. Comprehension of Fiqh, Islamic jurisprudence, is important because one cannot gain an overview of any issue until he has understood its particulars. Usul al-Fiqh, principles of Islamic jurisprudence, is also required so one understands the methodology of legal derivation and interpretation.

Other distinctive systems linked with tafsir study including Asbaab al-Nuzul, which is the field by which one learns the circumstances in which an ayah is revealed. It is important because the meaning of the ayah is more clearly understood once the circumstances in which it was revealed are known. Sometimes, the meaning of an ayah is wholly dependent on its historical background. Another is Ilm-ul-Naskh, which is knowledge of the abrogated ayah. In general, due to the Quran made up of revelations that revealed to Muhammad in the course of more than twenty years, certain verses are considered meant to be temporary and subsequently repealed by the following ones. Ilm-ul-Naskh is a science of identifying the abrogations, and it is important because abrogated rulings must be separated from the applied rulings. Ilm al-Hadith is knowledge of the hadith which explain mujmal (general) ayah, and Ilm al-Ladunni (علم اللدّني) is the endowed knowledge which is considered granted by God to his closest servants. This is for example a knowledge obtained directly from Allah through inspiration. They are the servants indicated in the hadith: "Allah will grant one who acts upon whatever he knows from a knowledge he never knew."

Principles
There are several frames of reference in which tafsir can be categorized. The main issue of framing constitutes its methodology. Tafsir can be broadly divided into two categories from the viewpoint of methodology employed in order to approach the interpretation. These categories are called tafsīr bi'l-ma'thūr (also known as tafsīr bi'r-riwāyah) and tafsīr bi'r-ra'y (also known as tafsīr bi'd-dirayah ).

Tafsir bi'l-Ma'thur (or Tafsir bi'r-Riwayah)
Tafsir bi'l-ma'thur, or commonly known as Tafsir bi'r-riwāyah, is the method of commenting on the Quran using traditional sources. Tafsir bi'r-riwāyah connotes tafsir using another portion of the Quran, or sayings of Muhammad, or saying of his companions. This classical tafsir method is agreed upon by all scholars, and is the most used method throughout history, partly because other methods have been criticized. Criticism of non-riwaya method is mostly based on two grounds; for one, Muhammad has condemned those who interpret the Quran from their own point of view, and for two, most companions of Muhammad have refrained from presenting their own ideas. Some important examples of tafsir bi'r-riwāyah are Jāmiʿ al-Bayān by al-Tabari and Tafseer al-Qurʾān al-ʿAẓeem by ibn Kathir. The sources used for tafsir bi'r-riwāyah can be ordered by the rank of authority, as the Quran, hadiths, the reports by the sahabah and tabi'iun, classical Arabic literature, and Isra'iliyat.

The most authoritative source of the interpretation is the Quran itself. Interpretation of the Quran employing other Quranic reference is very common because of the close interrelatedness of the verses of the Quran with one another. The Quranic verses explain and interpret one another, which leads many to believe that it has the highest level of authenticity. Many verses or words in the Quran are explained or further clarified in other verses of the Quran. One example of the hadith which extensively employs this source of method is Al-Mizan fi Tafsir al-Qur'an by Muhammad Husayn Tabataba'i. The authoritative source of method second to the Quran is Hadith, by using narratives of Muhammad to interpret the Quran. In this approach the most important external aids used are the collected oral traditions upon which Muslim scholars based Islamic history and law. Authority of this method is considered established by the statement made in the Quran that Muhammad is responsible for explanation and guidance. While some narratives are of revelation origin, others can be the result of reasonings made by Muhammad. One important aspect of these narratives is their origin. Narratives used for tafsir, and in general, must be of authentic origin (sahih). Narratives of such origin are considered requisite for tafsir.

Other source of the interpretation includes the accounts of Ṣaḥābah, companions of Muhammad, or tabi‘un, the generation after sahabah, and Tabi‘ al-Tabi‘in, the generation after tabi'un. Their authority is based on an account in hadith Sahih Bukhari, which accordingly, Muhammad said; "The best people are those living in my generation, then those coming after them (Tābi‘un), and then those coming after (the third generation)". If nothing is found in the Quran or the Hadīth, the commentator has recourse to what the Ṣaḥābah reported about various verses. These are generally considered above personal opinion, because these people grew up with everyday interaction with Muhammad, and had often asked about the meanings of verses or circumstances of their revelation; and they were very knowledgeable in both Arabic literature and Islamic thought. Another non-scripture based source of the interpretation is classical Arabic literature. Classical Arabic poetry and the text of the Quran are two resources which can be used as foundational reference in ascertaining the meaning and signification of the remaining literal and figurative diction of the Quran and its style of expression. Using Arabic poetry for defining words is a long used practice, in fact there are very few scholars who haven't used this source. Less authoritative source of the interpretation is Isra'iliyat, which is the body of narratives originating from Judeo-Christian traditions, rather than from other well-accepted sources. The Isra'iliyat are mostly non-biblical explanatory stories and traditions (Hebrew: midrashim) giving extra information or interpretation about events or individuals recorded in the Hebrew scriptures. Scholars starting with the Sahabah have studied narrative accounts of other Abrahamic religions to further explain and clarify verses, especially parables, in the Quran. While some may be accurate, these narratives are not subject to hadith authenticity criteria, and are generally not favored for use.

Tafsir bi'r-Ra'y (or Tafsir bi'd-dirayah)
Tafsir bi'r-ra'y, or commonly known as tafsir bi-al-diraya, is the method of using one's independent rational reasoning and mind (ijtihad) to form an opinion-oriented interpretation. The most distinctive feature of tafsir bi-al-diraya is the inclusion of the opinions of the commentator, thus forming the more objective view on Quranic verses. The relative paucity of traditional sources is also a practical reason why the scope of the methodology is augmented. This is considered sanctioned by the Quran itself, as written in the surah Sad verse 29:  This method is not interpretation by mere opinion however, but rather opinions must be based on the main sources. Performing Quranic interpretation using solely one's own opinion is believed to be prohibited by some Muslims. This is based on an authenticated hadith of Muhammad which states "He who says (something) concerning the Qur'ân without knowledge, he has taken his seat of fire". However, this hadith can alternatively be interpreted to refer to the importance of first properly studying and learning the Quran before attempting to teach or preach it to others. Accordingly, the method of independent reasoning (ijtihad) has several qualifications and conditions that need to be satisfied. Due to the nature of orientation toward opinions, this method is rejected by certain scholars such as Ibn Taymiyyah, and prohibited by Wahhabi Islamic doctrine. Some important examples of such tafsirs include Anwar al-Tanzil by al-Baydawi and Mafatih al-Ghayb by Fakhr al-Din al-Razi. Some parameters used by these scholars including linguistic resources, historical sources, methodological concepts such as maqasid or socio-cultural environment taken into consideration.

In terms of linguistic resources, literary elements of the Arabic language, including morphology, eloquence, syntax are an integral part of tafsir, as they constitute the basis of understanding and interpretation. Arabic has a systematic way of shaping words so one can know the meaning by knowing the root and the form the word was coined from. If any word can be given a meaning that is compatible with the rules of grammar, Quranic text can be interpreted that way. In terms of historical resources, scholars may choose to interpret verses according to external factors, including their historical context and their place of revelation. Historical context (Asbab al-nuzul) is particularly important to interpret verses according to how the Quran was revealed, when and under which circumstances, and much commentary was dedicated to history. The early tafsirs are considered to be some of the best sources for Islamic history. Classification of the place of revelation, whether it was revealed in Mecca or Medina, is important as well. This is because in general Meccan verses tend to have an iman (loosely translated as faith) nature that includes believing in Allah, Muhammad, and the day of judgment, whether it be theological foundations or basic faith principles. On the other hand, Medinan verses constitute legislation, social obligations, and constitution of a state.

On the more conceptual level, the idea of maqasid (goals or purpose) can be taken into account. Verses may be interpreted to preserve the general goals of shariah, which may be considered simply as bringing happiness to a person in this life and the hereafter. That way, any interpretation that threatens to compromise the preservation of religion, life, lineage, intellect or property may be discarded or ruled otherwise in order to secure these goals. Further, the socio-cultural environment may also taken into consideration. This includes understanding and interpreting the Quran while taking into account the cultural and social environment to which it has been revealed; or according to the scholars' own time. Often than not, the distinction can be made between the amm (general) verses that aimed at universal conditions for Muslims, and khass (specific) verses that applied to specific conditions, time or need. This is considered an integral part of analyzing the universality of the Quran. Scholars usually do not favor to confine verses to a single time interval, but rather interpret according to the needs of their time.

Sects 

Islamic theology is divided into myriad of schools and branches, and each of the schools' comments on the Quran with their own point of view.

Sunni 

The time of Muhammad ibn Jarir al-Tabari marks the classical period, which encompassed important Sunni tafsirs, such as Tafsir al-Thalabi, Tafsir of Al-Zamakhshari and Tafsir al-Tabari.
Tafsir al-Tabari is one of the most important tafsir works in Sunni Islam. This work provides exegetical material for the whole Quran, also contains conflicting information, which Tabari tries either to harmonize or argues in support of the one he feels more correct. Further he includes different readings, which according to him, both might be correct and gives his own opinion after each argumentation. Both linguistical and theological subjects are discussed throughout his work.

Regarding Sunni tafsir, it seems that Ibn Taimiyya serves as transition points between the Classical and post-Classical exegesis. The post-classical period is marked by the exegetic methodology of Ibn Kathir. Although Ibn Kathir claimed to rely on the works of Tabari, he introduced new methods for his exegesis, based on the teachings of Ibn Taymiyyah. His monovalency and sceptical attitude towards Isra'iliyyat are significant for his tafsir. It is much more selective than previous tafsirs, and disregards intellectual disciplines of grammar, law and theology, which has been previously brought into debate, but played no role in his Quranic exegesis.

In contemporary scholarship, translations of previous tafsirs into the English language are usually abridged versions of their longer original. One widespread version of Tafsir Ibn Kathir is published under the editorship of Muhammad Saed Abdul-Rahman. Such translations are often omitting content, to guide the readers against "wrong" content, following the puritanical approaches. Ibn Kathir gained widespread popularity, probably due to his straight approach in his own work, and the lack of alternative translations of traditional tafsirs. Abridged translations into Western language also appeared for Tafsir Tabari. One French version provided by Pierre Godé appeared in 1983. He edited the work in a way, that the author appears 'orthodox'. An English translation of Tabari by J. Cooper appeared in 1986. Bayan Ul Quran is another orthodox sunni tafsir written by Ashraf Ali Thanwi.

Shi'ite 
Tafsirs by Shia Muslims similarly deals with the issues concerned by Sunnis, and employs similar methodology as well, except for the adherence toward certain beliefs and creeds Shiism espouses. Distinctive features of Shia tafsirs include expounding of the concept of imamate, the heavier weight put on verses that considered to be the foundation of successorship to Muhammad within the Prophet's family begins with Ali, and the heavier authority put on interpretations attributed to The Twelve Imams. These characteristics result in distinction being made between the esoteric and the exoteric meaning of the Quran, and the esoteric meaning attributed to the imams preferred over the exoteric meaning. Certain Shia tafsirs are influenced by Mu'tazili thoughts as well, specifically on the theological issues. Some of the important examples of Shia mufassirs and their tafsir are Al-Tibbyan Fi Tafsir al-Quran by Shaykh Tusi (460/1067) and Majma al-Bayan lif'ulum al-Quran by Shaykh Tabarsi (d. 548/1153).

On the other hand, tafsir by Zaidi school of jurisprudence, which espouses the doctrine closest with Sunnis of all Shia sects, produces tafsir resembling Sunni tafsir in its quality. Some Zaidi tafsirs are considered popular among Sunnis as well.

Mu'tazila 
The Mu'tazila tradition of tafsir has received little attention in modern scholarship, owing to several reasons. First, several exegetical works by Mu'tazila scholars have been studied as books on theology rather than as works of tafsir. Secondly, the large Mu'tazilite tafsir at-Tahdib fi tafsir al-Qur'an by al-Hakim al-Jishumi has not been edited, and there is no complete copy of it available at any single location, which limits its accessibility to scholars.

Sufi 
It is an interpretation of the Quran which includes attribution of esoteric or mystic meanings to the text by the interpreter. In this respect, its method is different from the conventional exegesis. Esoteric interpretations do not usually contradict the conventional (in this context called exoteric) interpretations; instead, they discuss the inner levels of meaning of the Quran. A hadith from Muhammad which states that the Quran has an inner meaning, and that this inner meaning conceals a yet deeper inner meaning, and so on (up to seven levels of meaning), has sometimes been used in support of this view. Islamic opinion imposes strict limitations on esoteric interpretations especially when interior meaning is against exterior one. Esoteric interpretations are found mainly in Sufism and in the sayings (hadiths) of Shi'a Imams and the teachings of the Isma'ili sect. But Muhammad and the imams gave importance to its exterior as much as to its interior; they were as much concerned with its revelation as they were with its interpretation. These are generally not independently written, however, they are found in the books of Sufis.

Among the most significant Sunni Sufi tafsirs are:
 Tafsir al-Qur'an al-'Azim by al-Tustari (d. 283/896)
 Haqa'iq al-Tafsir by al-Sulami (d. 412/1021)
 Lata'if al-Isharat by al-Qushayri (d. 465/1072)
 Ara'is al-Bayan fi Haqa'iq al-Qur'an by Ruzbihan al-Baqli (d. 606/1209)
 Ruh al-Bayan fi Tafsir al-Qur'an by Isma'il Haqqi al-Brusawi (d. 1137/1725)
 Al-Bahr al-Madid fi Tafsir al-Qur'an al-Majid by Ahmad ibn 'Ajiba (d. 1224/1809)

Quranist 
Quranists merely believe in the Qur'an and reject other oral traditions. Turkish Islamic theologian Yaşar Nuri Öztürk denounced contemporary Islamic practices as altered. He distinguished between what he defined as true Islam and what he saw as customs and traditions introduced in the Umayyad period. In 1992, he published a 760-page, tafsir-like exegetical work called Kur'an'daki Islam. Each chapter, which deals with one surah, is structured around certain verses of the surah, or words occurring in the text, which need to be explained.

Edip Yüksel, Layth Saleh al-Shaiban, and Martha Schulte-Nafeh wrote Quran: A Reformist Translation, an English translation and commentary of the Qur'an. Yüksel is a follower of Rashad Khalifa.

Ghulam Ahmed Perwez wrote Mafhoom-ul-Quran, translated into English as Exposition of the Holy Qur'an.

Methodologies

Scientific approach 

Scholars deeply influenced by the natural and social sciences followed the materialists of Europe or the pragmatists. Under the influence of those secular theories, they declared that the religion's realities cannot go against scientific knowledge. What the religion claims to exist, but which the sciences reject should be interpreted in a way that conforms with the science; as for those things which the science is silent about, like the resurrection etc., they should be brought within the purview of the laws of matter; the pillars upon which the divine religious laws are based — like revelation, angel, Satan, prophethood, apostleship, Imamah (Imamate) etc. - are spiritual things, and the spirit is a development of the matter. As for the Quran itself, one should not explain it in the light of the old philosophy and theories, because they were not based on observations and tests — they were just a sort of mental exercise which has been totally discredited now by the modern science. Found by Ghazali and built upon by Razi, it is one of today's most abundant way of tafsir. A common example is Mafatih al-Ghayb by Fakhruddin al-Razi.

Legal approach 

Legal tafsir deals mainly with verses that have a legislative meaning (see ahkam), and it strives to obtain Islamic law from the Quran. Its practice was common in both the classical and modern periods. There is a dispute over the number of verses that contain jurisprudential guidance, with numbers ranging from 5 to 200 being reported. Works of legal tafsir were typically written from the perspectives of the madhhab of their respective authors. For example, Aḥkam al-Qur'an by al-Jassas was written according to the Hanafi Madhhab, Aḥkam al-Qur'an by Qaḍi Abū Bakr ibn al-'Arabī and al-Jaami' Li'Aḥkam al-Qur'an by al-Qurtubi were written according to the Maliki Madhhab, and Aḥkam al-Qur'an by Ilkiya was written according to the Shafi'i Madhhab. Some also cite Zad al-Maseer of ibn al-Jawzi as an example of a legal tafsir according to the Hanbali Madhhab.

Linguistic 
A newer work which incorporates and quotes the work of a multitude of previous scholars and analyzes the relevant Arabic root words (based on all available classic Arabic meanings), and references all relevant passages of the Quran, was done by Abdul Mannan Omar.

See also
 Esoteric interpretation of the Quran (Ta'wil)
 Islamic studies
 List of tafsir works
 Quran translations

References

Islamic terminology
 
Quran